Joseph Stillman (born August 1, 1959) is an American television and movie writer, producer, and director.

Before becoming a screenwriter, he worked for several TV shows, including Beavis and Butt-head, King of the Hill, Doug, and The Adventures of Pete & Pete.

Stillman also worked on screenplays for movies including Beavis and Butt-Head Do America, and Shrek and its sequel. He received a shared BAFTA for co-writing the first Shrek and a nomination for the Academy Award for Best Adapted Screenplay.

Filmography 
 Home Movies (1980 - production assistant)
 Creepshow (1982 - assistant editor)
 Doug (1991 - writer; 2 episodes)
 The Adventures of Pete & Pete (1993-1994 - writer; 3 episodes)
 Beavis and Butt-head (1993-1997 - writer)
 Beavis and Butt-head Do Christmas (1995 - writer)
 Clueless (1996 - writer; 1 episode)
 Beavis and Butt-head Do America (1996 - writer)
 King of the Hill (1997-1998 - consultant, writer, co-producer)
 Joseph: King of Dreams (2000 - screenplay)
 Shrek (2001 - co-writer)
 Shrek 2 (2004 - screenplay)
 Round It Goes (2006 - director, writer)
 Planet 51 (2009 - scriptwriter)
 Alien Zoo (in development )
 Gulliver's Travels (2010 - screenplay)
 Fred 2: Night of the Living Fred (2011 - screenplay)
 Sanjay and Craig (2013–2014 - writer, head writer)
 Kirby Buckets (2014-2016 - writer)
 Albert (2016 - screenplay)
 Danger & Eggs (2017 - writer)

References

External links 
 
 Joe Stillman at Film.com

American male screenwriters
American television writers
Animation screenwriters
Living people
Annie Award winners
Best Adapted Screenplay BAFTA Award winners
1959 births
American male television writers